Trzeboń may refer to:

Polish name for Třeboň in the Czech Republic
Trzeboń, Greater Poland Voivodeship (west-central Poland)